The 2022–23 Purdue Boilermakers men's basketball team represented Purdue University in the 2022–23 NCAA Division I men's basketball season. Their head coach is Matt Painter, who coached his 18th season with the Boilermakers. The Boilermakers played their home games at Mackey Arena in West Lafayette, Indiana as members of the Big Ten Conference.

With Northwestern's loss to Maryland on February 26, 2023, Purdue clinched a share of the Big Ten regular season championship. With Michigan's loss to Illinois on March 2, Purdue clinched the outright regular season championship, its first outright championship since 2017. The championship marked the school's 25th, the most in Big Ten history. On March 12, 2023, Purdue won its second Big Ten Tournament championship.

Purdue earned the No. 1 seed in the East region in the 2023 NCAA tournament. In the round of 64, Purdue lost to No. 16 seed Farleigh Dickinson, becoming the second men's No. 1 seed to lose to a No. 16 seed, following Virginia's 2018 loss to UMBC.

Previous season
The Boilermakers finished the 2021–22 season 29–8, 14–6 in Big Ten play to finish in third place. They defeated Penn State and Michigan State in the Big Ten tournament to advance to the championship game where they lost to Iowa. They received an at-large bid to the NCAA tournament as the No. 3 seed in the East region. There they defeated Yale and Texas to advance to the Sweet Sixteen. In the Sweet Sixteen, they were upset by No. 15-seeded Saint Peter's.

Offseason

Departures

Incoming transfers

Recruiting classes

2022 recruiting class

2023 Recruiting class

Roster

Schedule and results

|-
!colspan=9 style=|Exhibition

|-
!colspan=9 style=|Regular season

|-
!colspan=9 style=|Big Ten tournament

|-
!colspan=9 style=|NCAA tournament

|-

Source

Rankings

*AP does not release post-NCAA Tournament rankings.

References

Purdue Boilermakers men's basketball seasons
Purdue
Purdue
Purdue
Purdue